Mei Shimada (born 8 May 2002) is a Japanese professional footballer who plays as a forward for WE League club Urawa Reds.

Club career 
Shimada made her WE League debut on 12 September 2021.

References 

2002 births
Japanese women's footballers
Living people
Women's association football forwards
People from Mitaka, Tokyo
Association football people from Tokyo Metropolis
Urawa Red Diamonds Ladies players
WE League players